Kirill Ivanov may refer to:

 Kirill Ivanov (gymnast), Russian gymnast who participated in the 2009 Trampoline World Championships
 Kirill Ivanov (sport shooter), Soviet sport shooter who represented USSR at the 1988 Summer Olympics and 1992 Summer Olympics
 Kirill Ivanov-Smolensky (b. 1981), retired Russian tennis player